Leksand is a locality and the seat of Leksand Municipality in Dalarna County, Sweden, with 5,934 inhabitants in 2010. Leksand is situated on the southern branch of lake Siljan, where it flows into river Dalälven.

Sport
Leksand is famous for the Leksands IF ice hockey team, who have won four Swedish Championships, although the team is currently facing problems in performance when playing and they have received less funds. Leksand is also home to the Leksands Baseball and Softball Club, the oldest and one of the more successful baseball clubs in Sweden, having won 20 national championships in baseball and 7 in softball.  The club was founded in the late 1950s and currently has about 130 members.  Additionally, Leksand is home to the Baseball Academy Leksand, a Major League Baseball (MLB)-sponsored academy established in 2006. The academy is part of a broader drive by MLB to develop European talent through a system of baseball academies across the continent, and is the only such academy in Sweden. As of March 2010, Baseball Academy Leksand comprised 22 Swedish players and was managed by Tony Klarberg.

Climate
Leksand has a humid continental climate (Köppen Dfb). The influence of the Siljan lake is relatively minor on the local climate due to its modest size and freezing over every winter. However, some potential for lake-effect snow causing excessive accumulation is possible when there is open water. This resulted in a notable freak blizzard of the middle of May 2008 that left  of snow on the ground. Winters and springs are influenced by the inland position, with January being quite a bit colder than coastal areas to the east in Gävleborg but spring warming up sooner with a very low seasonal lag.

Industry
Local industry in Leksand includes Leksandsbröd, a producer of traditional Swedish Crispbread.

Notable people
Per-Olov Brasar - Former National Hockey League (NHL) forward, active 1977 to 1982
Kristian Matsson - The Tallest Man on Earth, folk musician
Johan Hedberg - Former NHL goalkeeper with the Pittsburgh Penguins, Dallas Stars, Atlanta Thrashers and New Jersey Devils
Anders J. Dahlin - Internationally acclaimed tenor and opera singer
Victor Rask - Former NHL forward with the Carolina Hurricanes, Minnesota Wild, and Seattle Kraken, currently plays for HC Fribourg-Gottéron in the Swiss National League

Sister cities
Aurora, Ontario, Canada
Tōbetsu, Hokkaido, Japan

References

External links

 
Populated places in Dalarna County
Municipal seats of Dalarna County
Swedish municipal seats
Populated places in Leksand Municipality
Populated lakeshore places in Sweden